TVD may refer to:

 True Vertical Depth, the vertical depth of the drill bit, used while directional drilling, especially when horizontal.
Total variation diminishing
The Vampire Diaries, an American television series which began airing in 2009.
ISO 4217 code for Tuvaluan dollar

it:TVD